Kihntinued is a 1982 studio album by Greg Kihn and the fourth album to be released as The Greg Kihn Band. It was the final album to feature long-time guitarist Dave Carpender.

Kihntinued saw a change in musical style for the group, leaning more towards softer rock and pop songs. The band started exploring new wave with the track "Sound System" as well as funk and reggae with songs like "Every Love Song" and "Tell Me Lies".  The album also includes the upbeat hit song "Happy Man" as well as a cover version of "(Your Love Keeps Lifting Me) Higher and Higher" by Jackie Wilson, under the title "Higher and Higher".

Track listing

Personnel
The Greg Kihn Band
Greg Kihn - guitar, lead vocals
Dave Carpender - guitar, backing vocals
Gary Phillips - keyboards
Steve Wright - bass, backing vocals
Larry Lynch - drums, backing vocals; lead vocals on "Higher and Higher"
Additional personnel
Jose Hernandez - saxophone on "Every Love Song"
Greg Douglass - guitar on "Family"

References

1982 albums
Greg Kihn albums
Beserkley Records albums